Collett's Bridge is a hamlet within the parish of Elm in the Isle of Ely, Cambridgeshire, England.
It is situated on the eastern boundary of the district 1.5 miles east of Elm. It lies just off Gosmoor Lane, adjacent to the Wisbech/Littleport Road. (A1101).

The settlement, which is a small group of dwellings, lies alongside the former Wisbech Canal, filled in as a waste disposal site in the early 1970s, and the former tram railway between Wisbech and Upwell.
In mid 1990 the housing stock numbered some 20 dwellings.

References

Hamlets in Cambridgeshire
Fenland District